Andre Cason (born January 20, 1969) is an American former track and field sprinter. He was a member of the American 4 × 100 meters relay team that won the gold medal at the 1991 World Championships in Tokyo with a world record time of 37.50 seconds. A few weeks after this event Cason, ran his first sub-10-second 100 meters race when winning in Koblenz in 9.99 seconds.

Cason attended Texas A&M University, where he was a two-time NCAA champion, and seven-time All-American for the Aggies.

The 1992 season started well for Cason as he set the world indoor record for the 60 meters on three occasions, leaving a standing world record of 6.41, and equalled the world indoor record for the 50 meters with a time of 5.62. Cason kept his excellent form until the early summer. However, at the 1992 US Olympic Trials he suffered a career threatening injury with a torn Achilles tendon, and was out for the rest of the season.

In 1993 Cason won the 100 m at the USA Outdoor Track and Field Championships in Eugene, Oregon and won a silver medal over 100 m at the 1993 World Championships in Athletics in Stuttgart, running in 9.92 s. In the 4×100 m relay he was a member of the US team that tied the world record at 37.40 s in the semi-finals, and won the gold in the final with 37.48 s.

Cason coached the Liaoning Province Team Sprinters, and assisted in building and cultivating the Chinese National Sprint Team from 2010-2013. In 2014, Cason oversaw the high performance training for professional MMA fighters in Hong Kong. Since late 2014, Cason has been the National Sprint Coach for the country of Thailand, and the Thailand Olympic team.

Personal bests

National titles
USA Indoor Track and Field Championships
60 m: 1991
USA Outdoor Track and Field Championships
100 m: 1993

References

External links

 HighBeam
 HighBeam

1969 births
Living people
Sportspeople from Virginia Beach, Virginia
Track and field athletes from Virginia
American male sprinters
Pan American Games track and field athletes for the United States
Pan American Games silver medalists for the United States
Pan American Games medalists in athletics (track and field)
Athletes (track and field) at the 1991 Pan American Games
World Athletics Championships athletes for the United States
World Athletics Championships medalists
World Athletics Indoor Championships winners
Universiade gold medalists for the United States
Universiade medalists in athletics (track and field)
Goodwill Games medalists in athletics
African-American male track and field athletes
World record setters in athletics (track and field)
USA Outdoor Track and Field Championships winners
USA Indoor Track and Field Championships winners
World Athletics Championships winners
Medalists at the 1989 Summer Universiade
Competitors at the 1990 Goodwill Games
Medalists at the 1991 Pan American Games
21st-century African-American people
20th-century African-American sportspeople